The lev (plural:  / , ; ISO 4217 code: BGN; numeric code: 975) is the currency of Bulgaria. In old Bulgarian the word "lev" meant "lion", the word 'lion' in the modern language is lаv. The lev is divided in 100 stotinki (singular:). Stotinka in Bulgarian means "a hundredth" and in fact is a translation of the French term "centime". Grammatically the word "stotinka" comes from the word "sto" (сто) - a hundred.

Since 1997, the lev has been in a currency board arrangement with initially the Deutsche Mark at a fixed rate of BGL 1000 to DEM 1. After the introduction of the euro and the redenomination of the lev in 1999, this has resulted in a fixed rate to the euro of BGN 1.95583 : EUR 1. Since 2020, the lev has been a part of the European Exchange Rate Mechanism (ERM II). The lev is scheduled to be supplanted by the euro on 1 January 2025.

Etymology 
The currency's name comes from the archaic Bulgarian word "lev," which meant "lion."

The lion is the national symbol of Bulgaria during the centuries.   Bulgaria, the lion features on numerous historical monuments. The oldest images, found on slates in the city of Stara Zagora, date back to 9-10 century AD. A lion is depicted on The Madara Horseman- an impressive medieval rock relief carved into a towering rock plateau in North Eastern Bulgaria, which is on UNESCO’s World Heritage List. In the Middle Ages Bulgarian kings, such as Ivan Shishman, one of the last rulers of the Second Bulgarian kingdom, celebrated the lion as a symbol of power.

In the time of Bulgarian national awakening in the years of Ottoman bondage, the lion was considered and widely used as a major national symbol.  Paisii of Hilendar, a discerning monastic and a key Revival figure, mentioned in his ground-breaking tome  that Bulgarians had a lion on their kings’ royal seal: a symbol of the bravery, courage and invincibility of Bulgarian warriors, who fought “like lions”.

Lion images on revolutionary flags , used in the 1876 freedom-seeking April uprising, provide a proof that the lion continued to be considered as a national symbol. In the immediate period leading up to the revolt, revolutionary flags were made, featuring a golden lion rampant and the motto ”Freedom or Death”. These flags, most often hand-made by local teachers or icon painters, have been preserved in Bulgarian museums to the present day. Most flags were made of green silk and had a painted or embroidered lion on them, in a heraldic posture and trampling over the Crescent- the symbol of the Ottoman Empire. The same image can be seen on items of one-time rebel outfits such as hats and buttons. In Bulgarian folklore and Revival Literature, these lion depictions were called lion signs attributed to the Bulgarian revolutionaries´ image. “Young Bulgarian heroes...lion signs on their foreheads, fire blazing in their eyes”, says a most popular Bulgarian Revival period song.

History

First lev (1881–1952)
The lev was introduced as Bulgaria's currency in 1881 with a value equal to the French franc. The gold standard was suspended between 1899 and 1906 and suspended again in 1912. Until 1916, Bulgaria's silver and gold coins were issued to the same specifications as those of the Latin Monetary Union. Banknotes issued until 1928 were backed by gold ("leva zlato" or "zlatni", "лева злато" or "златни") or silver ("leva srebro" or "srebarni", "лева сребро" or "сребърни").

In 1928, a new gold standard of 1 lev = 10.86956 mg gold was established.

During World War II, in 1940, the lev was pegged to the German Reichsmark at a rate of 32.75 leva = 1 Reichsmark. With the Soviet occupation in September 1944, the lev was pegged to the Soviet ruble at 15 leva = 1 ruble. A series of pegs to the U.S. dollar followed: 120 leva = 1 dollar in October 1945, 286.50 leva in December 1945 and 143.25 leva in March 1947. No coins were issued after 1943; only banknotes were issued until the currency reform of 1952.

Coins

Between 1881 and 1884, bronze 2, 5 and 20 stotinki, and silver 50 stotinki, 1, 2 and 5 leva were introduced, followed, in 1888, by cupro-nickel , 5, 10 and 20 stotinki. Gold 10 and 20 leva were issued in 1894. Bronze 1 stotinka were introduced in 1901.

Production of silver coins ceased in 1916, with zinc replacing cupro-nickel in the 5, 10 and 20 stotinki in 1917. In 1923, aluminum 1 and 2 leva coins were introduced, followed by cupro-nickel pieces in 1925. In 1930, cupro-nickel 5 and 10 leva and silver 20, 50 and 100 leva were introduced, with silver coins issued until 1937, in which year aluminium-bronze 50 stotinki were issued.

In 1940, cupro-nickel 20 and 50 leva were issued, followed, in 1941, by iron 1, 2, 5 and 10 leva. In 1943, nickel-clad-steel 5, 10 and 50 leva were struck. These were the last coins issued for this version of the lev.

Banknotes

In 1885, the Bulgarian National Bank introduced notes for 20 and 50 gold leva, followed in 1887 by 100 gold leva and, in 1890, by 5 and 10 gold leva notes. In 1899, 5, 10 and 50 silver leva notes were issued, followed by 100 and 500 silver leva in 1906 and 1907, respectively. 500 gold leva notes were also introduced in 1907.

In 1916, 1 and 2 silver leva and 1000 gold leva notes were introduced, followed by 2500 and 10,000 gold leva notes in 1919. In 1924, 5000 leva notes were issued, the first to lack a metal designation. In 1928, a new series of notes (dated 1922 and 1925) was introduced which gave the denominations solely in leva. Denominations introduced were 5, 10, 20, 50, 100, 500, 1000 and 5000 leva. These were followed in 1929 by 200 and 250 leva.

In 1930, coins up to 100 leva replaced notes, although 20-lev notes were issued between 1943 and 1950. Between 1943 and 1945, State Treasury Bills for 1000 and 5000 leva were issued.

Second lev (1952–1962)
In 1952, following wartime inflation, a new lev replaced the original lev at a rate of 1 "new" lev = 100 "old" leva. However the rate for banking accounts was different, ranging from 100:3 to 200:1. Prices for goods were replaced at a rate of 25:1. The new lev was pegged to the U.S. dollar at a rate of 6.8 leva = 1 dollar, falling to 9.52 leva on July 29, 1957.

Coins
In 1952, coins (dated 1951) were introduced in denominations of 1, 3, 5, 10 and 25 stotinki, with the lower three denominations in brass and the higher three in cupro-nickel. Shortly after, cupro-nickel 20 stotinki coins dated 1952 were also issued, followed by 50 stotinki in 1959 and 1 lev in 1960 which replaced the 1 lev note (both also in cupro-nickel). All stotinki coins feature a head of wheat around denomination on the reverse and state emblem on the obverse, while the lev coin depicts an olive branch wreath around the denomination.

Banknotes
In 1952, state notes (dated 1951)  were issued in 1, 3 and 5 leva, together with notes of the National Bank for 10, 25, 50, 100 and 200 leva. 500-lev notes were printed but not issued. 1 lev notes were withdrawn after the introduction of a coin in 1960. 1, 3, and 5 leva depict the state emblem, while all denominations 10 leva and up depict Georgi Dimitrov, who had a postmortem cult of personality built up around him by that time period. The reverse side of 1 lev, 3 and 5 leva notes depict hands holding up the hammer and sickle, while higher denominations each depict workers at various trades.

Third lev (1962–1999)

In 1962, another redenomination took place at the rate of 10 to 1, setting the exchange rate at 1.17 leva = 1 U. S. dollar, with the tourist rate falling to 2 leva on February 1, 1964. After this, the lev remained fairly stable for almost three decades. However, like other Communist countries' currencies, it was not freely convertible for Western funds. Consequently, black market rates were five to ten times higher than the official rate. During the period, until 1989 the lev was backed by gold, and the banknotes have the text stating: "The bank note is backed by gold and all assets of the bank".

After the fall of communism, Bulgaria experienced several episodes of drastic inflation and currency devaluation. In order to change this, in 1997, the lev was pegged to the Deutsche Mark, with 1,000 lev equal to 1 DM (one lev equal to 0.1 pfennig).

Since 1997, Bulgaria has been in a system of currency board, and all Bulgarian currency in circulation has been completely backed by the foreign exchange reserves of the Bulgarian National Bank (BNB).

Coins

In 1962, aluminum-bronze 1, 2, and 5 stotinki, and nickel-brass 10, 20 and 50 stotinki and 1 lev were introduced. The coin series strongly resembles coinage from the Soviet Union during the same period, particularly in design and size.

The state emblem is depicted on the obverse of all coins, which went through several changes. The first change in 1962 with the introduction of the new coinage, and the second change in 1974, with the ribbons being the most noticeable change.

A number of commemorative 2 leva coins also circulated during this period, often released into circulation as they had relatively high production numbers and little collector's value. Higher denomination lev coins have also been introduced into circulation at an irregular basis with varying sizes and metallic compositions, including silver. Mostly due to an overstock of numismatic coins not getting sold to collectors. Similar occurrences to this can be seen with high denomination coins from East Germany and Poland during the same period.

Post-communist coins

In 1992, after the communist era, older coins were withdrawn and a new coinage was introduced in denominations of 10, 20 and 50 stotinki, 1, 2, 5 and 10 leva. All were struck in nickel-brass except for the cupro-nickel 10 leva. In 1997, nickel-brass 10, 20 and 50 leva were introduced.

Banknotes
In 1962, the National Bank issued notes for 1, 2, 5, 10 and 20 leva. A second series, in the same denominations, was issued in 1974. 50 leva notes were introduced in 1990. Again, denominations 10 leva and up featured Georgi Dimitrov, 1, 2, and 5 featured the state emblem. After the fall of the communist regime, new notes were introduced for 20, 50, 100 and 200 leva. These were followed by 500 leva notes in 1993, 1000 and 2000 leva in 1994, 5000 and 10,000 leva in 1996 (re-released with new design and look in 1997), and 50,000 leva in 1997. Furthermore, two new banknotes of 20,000 and 100,000 leva were scheduled to be introduced in 1997 and 1998, but their production was canceled following the introduction of currency board in 1997.

Fourth lev (1999–present)
On 5 July 1999 the lev was redenominated at 1000:1 with 1 new lev equal to 1 Deutsche Mark. The ISO 4217 currency code for the new Bulgarian lev is BGN. The lev is pegged at €1 = 1.95583 leva (previously DEM 1 = BGN 1, continuing the fixed exchange rate from the third lev).

Euro adoption

Since Bulgaria gained EU membership in 2007 various dates have been suggested as the expected end of the lev: towards the end of that year 1 January 2012 was a possible date; however, the global financial crisis of 2008 and the Eurozone crisis cooled the initial enthusiasm for the euro. Nevertheless, in 2009 The Economist noted suggestions to accelerate Bulgaria's path to the euro, or even let it be adopted immediately, despite the EU institutions' unwillingness to deviate from a policy of euro adoption only after five Euro convergence criteria have been met. In 2011 the Bulgarian finance minister Simeon Djankov acknowledged his earlier eagerness for Bulgaria to join the euro, but considered 2015 as a more likely date. If Bulgaria follows the standard path to euro adoption, it would use the euro two years after joining the European exchange rate mechanism (ERM II) (a formality given the lev's peg to the euro). In late 2010, given Bulgaria's improving economy, analysts thought that Bulgaria would join the ERM II the following year. However, the continued postponement of joining the mechanism has prevented Bulgaria meeting all five convergence criteria: its rebounding economy later met the four other criteria.

On 10 July 2020, along with Croatia, Bulgaria joined the ERM II, which allows it to adopt the euro no earlier than two years after joining assuming the other convergence criteria are met.

Coins
In 1999, coins in denominations of 1, 2, 5, 10, 20 and 50 stotinki were introduced. A 1 lev coin replaced the 1 lev banknote 2002, and a 2 lev coin the 2 lev banknote in 2015.

Commemorative coins

In 2004, 2005, and 2007 commemorative circulation issues were struck of the 50 stotinkas coin. In 2018 a commemorative circulation issue of the 2 leva coin was issued. These coins are not found in general circulation.

Many commercial commemorative coins have also been minted.

Banknotes
In 1999, banknotes were introduced in denominations of 1, 2, 5, 10, 20 and 50 leva. 100 leva notes were added in 2003. The 1 and 2 lev notes were later replaced by coins of similar value and withdrawn from circulation.

Exchange rates
The fourth lev was pegged to the German mark at par from the start. With the replacement of the Deutsche Mark by the euro, the lev's peg effectively switched to the euro at the rate of 1.95583 leva = 1 euro (precisely equivalent to the German mark's fixed exchange rate to euro). This rate is unlikely to change before the lev's eventual retirement.

See also
 Bulgaria and the euro
 Commemorative coins of Bulgaria
 Economy of Bulgaria
 Medieval Bulgarian coinage

Notes

External links 

 Bulgarian National Bank: Non-periodical Publications: Catalogues
 Bulgarian Lev: Catalog of Banknotes
 Historical and current banknotes of Bulgaria
 Historical banknotes of the People's Republic of Bulgaria

Currencies of Bulgaria
1881 establishments in Bulgaria
Fixed exchange rate